Cherrie Choi  (born 7 September 1972), formerly known as Cai Li, is a Hong Kong singer best known for "Zhu Fu Ni", "Jue Lian", "Zen Me", "Xiang Gui Jia De Nv Hai" and "Conversation" (collaborated with George Lam).

Early life and education 
Choi grew up in a tenement building on Fuk Wa Street in Sham Shui Po, Kowloon, in Hong Kong. She attended . While still in school she performed at a lounge with Stephanie Che and Fat Ma. She signed with Warner Music Group in 1986. 

In 1989, she applied for the Hong Kong Secondary School Examination.

Career 
In 1987, she participated in the 3rd Asia-Canton Union Singing Contest with the song "Betrayal". In 1988, she debuted with the song "How". She released the album Hope produced by Lin Shi followed by the albums Incredible and Lover of June with the songs "Endless Love", "Close Your Eyes", and "A Covenant of Life and Death". With George Lam she released the song "Dialogue". 

In 1990, she released the single "Close Your Eyes" which reached number one on the  remained number one for two weeks. In the same year, she played one of the leading roles in the TV series "Love Beats". 

In 2008, Cai Lier and Ouyang Dexun joined ) and participated in the show ). She began using her real name Cai Li.

In 2017, she appeared in the TV show "Cantopop At 50". 

In an interview in December 2017, Cai Li talked about her experience entering the music industry explaining that she sang "Saving All My Love For You" at a gathering of her parents and friends where an employee from Warner Records was there. She signed with Warner Records at the age of fifteen, and released her first album a year later. 

In 2018, following "Cantopop At 50", a group of singers in the late 1980s and early 1990s formed the "Classic Alumni Association". On July 15, she and a group of singers from the "Classic Alumni Association" participated in "Love Enguang Classic Golden Melody Concert" charity concert.

Discography

Albums 
 希望 (Hope) (1988)
  (1989)
 每一分爱 (Mei Yi Fen Ai) (1989)
 Close Your Eyes (Best 13 songs) (1990)
  (1991)
  (1992)
 Once Upon A Time…(Best of album) (1993)
 Legend Series of Warner Music –Gigi Lai, Cherrie Choi (1999)
 响 I Am Here (2016)

Notable album appearances 

 Millennium Greatest Hits, Vol.2 , various artists

Television series 
  (1993)
 Untraceable Evidence (1997)
 Armed Reaction (1998)
  (2019)

References 

Living people
1972 births
Cantonese-language singers
Cantopop singers
21st-century Hong Kong women singers
Cantonese people